The Court of Imperial Sacrifices, also known as the Court of Sacrificial Worship, was a central government agency in several imperial Chinese and Vietnamese dynasties. It was generally in charge of conducting major state sacrificial ceremonies according to ritual regulations. In China, the office was created during the Northern Qi dynasty (550–577) and continued until the Qing dynasty (1636–1912). In Vietnam, it was created by Lê Thánh Tông in 1466, and continued until the Nguyễn dynasty.

It was one of the Nine Courts and normally under the supervision of the Ministry of Rites. Prior to the Qing dynasty it was the most prestigious of the Nine Courts.

References

Nine Courts
Government of the Song dynasty
Government of the Tang dynasty
Government of the Yuan dynasty
Government of the Sui dynasty
Government of the Ming dynasty
Government of the Qing dynasty